Argyra leucocephala is a species of fly in the family Dolichopodidae. It is distributed in Europe, except for the southeast.

References

Diaphorinae
Insects described in 1824
Diptera of Europe
Taxa named by Johann Wilhelm Meigen